Jeffrey Leonard Jarrett (born March 14, 1967) is an American professional wrestler and promoter. He is currently signed to All Elite Wrestling (AEW), where he also serves as Director of Business Development.

Beginning his career in his father Jerry Jarrett's Continental Wrestling Association (CWA) in 1986, Jarrett first came to prominence upon debuting with a country music star gimmick in the World Wrestling Federation (WWF, now WWE) in 1993. Over the next nine years, he alternated between the WWF and its main competitor, World Championship Wrestling (WCW). After WCW was purchased by the WWF in 2001, Jarrett joined the upstart World Wrestling All-Stars (WWA) promotion. In 2002, Jarrett and his father together founded NWA: Total Nonstop Action (NWA-TNA) (now known as Impact Wrestling). After departing the promotion in 2014, Jarrett founded another new promotion, Global Force Wrestling (GFW). After a failed merger of TNA and GFW, he cut ties with TNA. Jarrett then wrestled in Mexico for Lucha Libre AAA Worldwide before returning to WWE in January 2019 as an on-screen talent and producer. He departed WWE once more in August 2022, making his debut with AEW that November.

A third-generation wrestler, Jarrett has had over 80 championship reigns throughout his career, among them the NWA World Heavyweight Championship (six times), WCW World Heavyweight Championship (four times), and AAA Mega Championship (twice). He was inducted into the Impact Hall of Fame in 2015 and the WWE Hall of Fame in 2018.

Professional wrestling career

Early career (1986–1993) 
Born in Hendersonville, Tennessee, Jarrett became involved with basketball when he was in high school, but he worked for his father Jerry Jarrett's Continental Wrestling Association as a referee in March 1986 and trained as a wrestler under his father and Tojo Yamamoto. Jarrett made his in-ring debut at the age of 18 on April 6, 1986 when jobber Tony Falk attempted to end his lengthy losing streak by challenging Jarrett, then a referee, to a match. Jarrett accepted the challenge, wrestling Falk to a 10-minute draw. Jarrett is a third-generation wrestler: his father wrestled, as did his maternal grandfather, Eddie Marlin, while his paternal grandmother, Christine, was employed by Nashville-based wrestling promoters Nick Gulas and Roy Welch. He also wrestled with the American Wrestling Association (AWA) and the Continental Wrestling Federation (CWF) in the late 1980s.

In 1989, his father Jerry purchased the Texas-based World Class Championship Wrestling (WCCW) promotion and merged it with the CWA to create the United States Wrestling Association (USWA). Over the following years, Jarrett won the USWA Southern Heavyweight Championship on 10 occasions and the USWA World Tag Team Championship on 15 occasions. Jarrett also wrestled on the independent circuit for seven years, appearing in Japan and Puerto Rico. In 1990, he wrestled his first tour of Japan for Super World Sports (SWS). In 1993, he was hired by the World Wrestling Federation. Jarrett would continue wrestling for USWA full-time until losing the championship to Jerry Lawler on December 20, 1993, but return sporadically for future dates.

World Wrestling Federation (1992, 1993–1996)

Early appearances (1992) 
Jarrett's first involvement with World Wrestling Federation (WWF) came on August 9, 1992, when he participated in the kick-off to the first cross-promotional angle between the WWF and the USWA. Sitting at ringside along with Jerry Lawler at the WWF house show that was being held at the Pyramid in Memphis, Tennessee, he issued an open challenge to any WWF wrestler. After defeating Kamala by disqualification that night, Bret Hart accepted Jarrett's challenge for a match the next time that the WWF came to Memphis. Beginning in October, Jarrett himself began making appearances on WWF house show events, defeating Mondo Kleen (who would later debut as Damian Demento) and Barry Horowitz. At a WWF Wrestling Challenge taping in Louisville, Kentucky on October 28, Jarrett scored his biggest victory of his nascent WWF career by upsetting Rick Martel. However, the scheduled match between Bret Hart and Jarrett on October 31 in Memphis was cancelled due to poor weather. Following the cancelled Memphis show, he returned to the USWA.

Double J (1993–1994) 

Nearly a year later, Jarrett returned to the World Wrestling Federation. He made his televised return on October 23, 1993 on WWF Superstars as a heel under the gimmick of "Double J" Jeff Jarrett, a country music singer who intended to elevate his singing career through his exposure as a wrestler. Jarrett's character would strut to the ring wearing flashing "Double J" hats and ring attire, while he punctuated his promos with the phrase "Ain't I great?". He ended his interviews by distinctly spelling out his name ("That's J-E-Double-F, J-A-Double-R, E-Double-T!"). He would often win matches by smashing opponents with an acoustic guitar, which was nicknamed "El Kabong" after the cartoon character Quick Draw McGraw.

Jarrett had his first televised match with the WWF on the December 20, 1993 episode of Raw, defeating PJ Walker. Jarrett made his pay-per-view debut in January 1994 at the Royal Rumble, entering the Royal Rumble match as the 12th participant and was eliminated less than 90 seconds later by Randy Savage. Also at the Royal Rumble, Jarrett participated in attacking The Undertaker and forcing him into the casket, an incident that would be a focal point in Undertaker's rematch later that year. Jarrett was scheduled to wrestle in a five vs. five tag match at WrestleMania X, but the match did not take place due to time constraints. However, the match did take place on the April 4 episode of Raw, with Jarrett's team winning. During this time, Jarrett started having what would be a very long string of matches with Doink (Ray Apollo) during house shows in which he usually won the match. Despite getting past Lex Luger by countout in the first round, Jarrett lost in the second round of the 1994 King of the Ring tournament, being pinned by the 1-2-3 Kid. Only weeks before SummerSlam, the WWF promoted a match as part of a "rap versus country" rivalry that pitted Jarrett against Mabel who portrayed a rapper. There was little buildup for the match until Mabel tried to provoke Jarrett into a fight, but Jarrett simply exited. At SummerSlam, Jarrett won the match by pinfall. Around this time, Jarrett began a feud with the 1-2-3 Kid's friend, Intercontinental Champion Razor Ramon. Jarrett would face both men at Survivor Series, Jarrett's team competed in another five vs. five tag team match, this time with elimination rules. Jarrett's team lost when all the members of the team including himself were counted out. Later during the event, Jarrett once again tried to illegally attack The Undertaker, but this time was stopped by Chuck Norris. In January 1995, Jarrett would once again feud with Bret Hart, ultimately losing to Hart on the January 23 episode of Raw.

WWF Intercontinental Champion (1995–1996) 
At the Royal Rumble in Tampa, Florida, Jarrett defeated Razor Ramon to win the Intercontinental Championship. In an effort to become a dual champion, Jarrett challenged Diesel for the WWF World Heavyweight Championship in the main event of the February 20 episode of Raw, but lost the match. Razor Ramon received a rematch at WrestleMania XI which Jarrett lost by disqualification, but retained the Intercontinental Championship. Jarrett was then joined by The Roadie, with the duo losing to Razor Ramon in a handicap match at In Your House 1. On April 26, 1995, the Intercontinental Championship was declared vacant after a controversial ending to a match between Jarrett and Bob Holly. They had a rematch later that evening where Jarrett reclaimed the title. On May 19, Razor Ramon regained the title from Jarrett in Montreal, Quebec, but Jarrett won it back two nights later in Trois-Rivières, Quebec, making him a three-time Intercontinental Champion.

At In Your House 2: The Lumberjacks on July 23, 1995, Jarrett performed the song "With My Baby Tonight". Later that evening, Jarrett lost the Intercontinental Championship to Shawn Michaels. Following the event, Jarrett left the WWF for five months and returned to the USWA. Jarrett returned to the WWF at In Your House 5 on December 17, 1995, feuding with Ahmed Johnson. Jarrett lost to Johnson by disqualification at the 1996 Royal Rumble and left the WWF shortly thereafter due to a contract dispute. Later that year, The Roadie revealed that he had in fact sung "With My Baby Tonight" and that Jarrett had been lip synching.

World Championship Wrestling (1996–1997) 

In October 1996, Jarrett was hired by World Championship Wrestling (WCW), signing a one-year contract. Upon debuting in WCW, Jarrett became a "free agent" in the rivalry between The Four Horsemen and the New World Order (nWo). After defeating Chris Benoit at Starrcade, and Steve McMichael, both by cheating when the referee was distracted, Jarrett was reluctantly inducted into the Four Horsemen. On June 9, 1997, Jarrett defeated Dean Malenko to win the United States Heavyweight Championship. In mid-1997, Jarrett was kicked out of the Four Horsemen and began feuding with Horsemen member Steve McMichael. Despite aligning himself with McMichael's then-wife, Debra McMichael, Jarrett lost the United States Heavyweight Championship to McMichael on August 21. In October, Jarrett's contract expired and he opted to return to the WWF, despite the dominance of WCW in the ongoing Monday Night Wars.

World Wrestling Federation (1997–1999)

National Wrestling Alliance invasion (1997–1998) 

Jarrett returned to the WWF on the October 20, 1997 episode of Raw is War, delivering a worked shoot speech in which he criticized both WCW President Eric Bischoff and WWF Chairman Vince McMahon. After briefly feuding with The Undertaker, Jarrett defeated Barry Windham to win the vacant NWA North American Heavyweight Championship. In early 1998, Jarrett joined forces with Jim Cornette and his stable of "invading" National Wrestling Alliance wrestlers, and began defending the North American Heavyweight Championship on WWF television. In March, Jarrett left Cornette's stable, and Cornette stripped him of the title and awarded it to Windham.

Teaming with Owen Hart (1998–1999) 

Jarrett went on to reprise his country music singer gimmick on the March 2, 1998 edition of Monday Night Raw, introducing Tennessee Lee as his new manager. At Unforgiven: In Your House on April 26, 1998, Jarrett once again sang alongside Sawyer Brown with their hit single, "Some Girls Do". On the June 1, 1998 edition of Raw, Tennessee Lee introduced Southern Justice (formerly known as The Godwinns) as Jarrett's new bodyguards. Jarrett grew a goatee at that time. On the August 9, 1998 edition of Sunday Night Heat, Jarrett fired Tennessee Lee after he had inadvertently cost Jarrett multiple matches in the preceding weeks. Jarrett and Southern Justice then began feuding with D-Generation X (DX), with Jarrett losing to DX member X-Pac in a hair vs. hair match at SummerSlam. Jarrett's long hair was subsequently cut short by DX and Howard Finkel, who had himself been shaved bald by Jarrett and Southern Justice shortly before SummerSlam. Jarrett and Southern Justice were defeated by DX at Breakdown in September, and the trio separated shortly thereafter.

Jarrett briefly feuded with Al Snow before reuniting with Debra, who had left WCW for the WWF, and forming a tag team with Owen Hart. Hart and Jarrett were close friends and travel partners for years, so the team jelled almost immediately. Jarrett and Hart won the WWF Tag Team Championship from Ken Shamrock and The Big Boss Man, successfully defending the titles at WrestleMania XV before losing to Kane and X-Pac on an episode of Raw. Eight days after Hart died in a stunt that went wrong at Over the Edge, Jarrett defeated The Godfather, who Owen was scheduled to face at the pay-per-view, for the Intercontinental Championship. As he was handed the title belt, he yelled Hart's name in tribute to his friend. In mid-1999, Jarrett exchanged the Intercontinental Championship with Edge and D'Lo Brown on two more occasions. His fifth reign broke Razor Ramon's record from 1995. He held the record until Chris Jericho's seventh reign in 2004.

In the months that followed, Jarrett became increasingly abusive towards Debra. At SummerSlam, Jarrett challenged D'Lo Brown for both the WWF European and Intercontinental Championships, with Debra accompanying Brown to the ring following an argument with Jarrett. Brown lost the match after both Mark Henry and Debra turned on him, making Jarrett the second ever "Euro-Continental Champion". On the following episode of Raw, Jarrett rewarded Debra and Henry by giving Debra an assistant, Miss Kitty, and Henry the European Championship. In late 1999, Jarrett began feuding with Chyna over the Intercontinental Championship. In the course of the feud, Jarrett became somewhat misogynistic, attacking numerous females, including both wrestlers and actress Cindy Margolis, and executing the figure-four leglock on them. Jarrett eventually abandoned Debra in favor of Miss Kitty after he and Debra were defeated by Stephanie McMahon and Test in a mixed tag team match. He later also turned on Miss Kitty after she lost a match that Jarrett had inserted her into in his place.

Jarrett left the WWF in October 1999, right after WWF head writer Vince Russo resigned from the WWF in order to join WCW. Jarrett's contract expired on October 16, 1999, one day before his scheduled match with Chyna at No Mercy. Jarrett wrestled at No Mercy nonetheless, losing the Intercontinental Championship to Chyna. Chyna later alleged that Jarrett and Russo had colluded in order to delay Jarrett's title defense until after Jarrett's contract had expired, and that Jarrett had subsequently made a deal with WWF Chairman Vince McMahon for $200,000 in order to wrestle at No Mercy without a contract.

In 2006, Jarrett asserted that he had been paid only what he was owed by the WWF. In a 2008 interview for a TNA special, Jarrett stated that not only were his negotiations cordial and in good faith, but that he also got stock options in WWF's IPO, which occurred two days after he left.

World Championship Wrestling (1999–2001)

nWo 2000 (1999–2000) 

Jarrett returned to WCW on the October 18, 1999 episode of Monday Nitro, attacking Buff Bagwell and proclaiming himself the "Chosen One" of WCW. Jarrett took part in a tournament for the vacant WCW World Heavyweight Championship, winning his first three matches with the assistance of Creative Control. At Mayhem, he was eliminated from the tournament after losing his semi-final match to Chris Benoit following interference from Dustin Rhodes. At Starrcade, Jarrett defeated Rhodes in a Bunkhouse Brawl, then unsuccessfully challenged Benoit for the United States Heavyweight Championship in a ladder match. On the following episode of Nitro, Jarrett defeated Benoit in a rematch, winning the belt. In the same evening, Jarrett reformed the nWo with WCW World Heavyweight Champion Bret Hart and the reigning WCW World Tag Team Champions, Kevin Nash and Scott Hall, with the foursome calling themselves "nWo 2000".

In early 2000, Jarrett feuded with WCW Commissioner Terry Funk, who forced him to wrestle three veterans – George Steele, Tito Santana, and Jimmy Snuka – in one night. Jarrett was stripped of the United States Heavyweight Championship after suffering a concussion during his bout with Snuka, but the title was returned to him by Nash after he became WCW Commissioner. In order to help him retain the title, Jarrett drafted the Harris Brothers (formerly Creative Control) into nWo 2000. In the following months, Jarrett repeatedly challenged Sid Vicious for the WCW World Heavyweight Championship, in the process clashing with Nash and winning the position of WCW Commissioner for himself. Following Bret Hart's retirement, the nWo disbanded.

WCW World Heavyweight Champion (2000–2001) 

In April, WCW was rebooted by Eric Bischoff and Vince Russo, with all titles vacated as a result. Bischoff and Russo also created The New Blood, a stable of younger wrestlers who feuded with The Millionaire's Club, made up of the older members of the WCW roster. Jarrett joined The New Blood, and at Spring Stampede on April 16, he defeated Millionaires Club member Diamond Dallas Page to win the vacant WCW World Heavyweight Championship. Page regained the title on April 24, and on April 25, the title was contested in a tag team match pitting Jarrett and Bischoff against Page and actor David Arquette. Arquette won the WCW World Heavyweight Championship after pinning Bischoff. Jarrett hit Page with the championship belt while special referee Kimberly Page's back was turned; WCW official Mickie Jay counted Bischoff out while Jarrett had Page pinned, who kicked out. At Slamboree on May 7, Jarrett defeated Page and Arquette in a three-way triple cage match to win his second WCW World Heavyweight Championship after Arquette turned on Page.

In May, Jarrett won and lost the WCW World Heavyweight Championship on two further occasions, regaining the title from Ric Flair both times. Jarrett feuded with Nash and Hulk Hogan throughout June 2000, and on July 9 at Bash at the Beach, he faced Hogan with the world championship on the line; the match ended swiftly after Jarrett immediately lay down, allowing Hogan to rest a boot on his chest and win the title, with Hogan commenting, "That's why this company is in the damn shape it's in—because of bullshit like this!". Vince Russo subsequently came to the ring and delivered a profanity-laced statement, in which he accused Hogan of politicking and claimed that Hogan had used his creative control to refuse to lose to Jarrett. Russo then stated that, while Hogan was free to keep the title belt he had just won (the "Hulk Hogan Memorial Belt"), Jarrett would wrestle Booker T for the official WCW World Heavyweight Championship later that night. Booker T won the match and Hogan did not appear in WCW again. It is disputed whether the situation was a shoot, a work, or some combination of the two.

In the following months, Jarrett briefly feuded with Booker T, Mike Awesome, Sting, Buff Bagwell, and Flair. In late 2000, he joined forces with the Harris Brothers once more, with the trio defeating The Filthy Animals at Starrcade on December 17. In the same evening, Jarrett aligned himself with WCW World Heavyweight Champion Scott Steiner by helping Steiner defeat Sid Vicious.

In 2001, Jarrett and Steiner became members of The Magnificent Seven, a large stable headed by Flair. Flair and Jarrett feuded with Dusty and Dustin Rhodes until March, when WCW was purchased by the WWF.

Uninterested in Jarrett, the WWF neglected to acquire his contract, leaving him without a job. On the March 26 episode of the WWF's Raw program (which coincided with the final episode of Nitro), company owner Vince McMahon was seen watching Jarrett within the WCW venue on a television set. Mocking Jarrett's trademark of distinctly spelling out his name, McMahon stated that Jarrett would be "Capital G, Double-O, Double-N, Double-E – GOONNEE!"

World Wrestling All-Stars (2001–2003) 
With both WCW and the WWF now ruled out as employment options, Jarrett resurfaced in World Wrestling All-Stars (WWA) in late 2001, wrestling throughout Australia and Europe. Jarrett won the WWA World Heavyweight Championship, but was later stripped of the title. Jarrett returned to the WWA during his first NWA World Heavyweight Championship reign; he defeated Sting for the WWA World Heavyweight Championship at the last WWA event on May 25, 2003, unifying the two titles.

NWA Total Nonstop Action / Total Nonstop Action Wrestling (2002–2014)

NWA World Heavyweight Champion (2002–2006) 

In June 2002, Jarrett and his father created a limited-liability company, J Sports and Entertainment and opened a new pro wrestling promotion, Total Nonstop Action Wrestling (TNA). TNA aired in a weekly pay-per-view format until May 2004, when the promotion negotiated a television deal with Fox Sports Net and began broadcasting Impact!. In November 2004, TNA began airing monthly pay-per-views instead of weekly pay-per-views, and in October 2005 Impact! moved to Spike TV. Panda Energy and its Chairman and CEO, Robert Carter, acquired a controlling interest in TNA in 2002, although Jarrett remained a minority owner.

On the inaugural TNA pay-per-view on June 19, 2002, Jarrett took part in a Gauntlet for the Gold with the NWA World Heavyweight Championship on the line, but was eliminated by country singer Toby Keith. In the following months, Jarrett feuded with Scott Hall, Brian Lawler, and Brian Girard James. On November 20, 2002, Jarrett defeated Ron Killings to win the NWA World Heavyweight Championship with the assistance of Vince Russo. After Jarrett refused to join Russo's Sports Entertainment Xtreme stable, Russo turned the members of SEX, including the debuting Raven, against Jarrett. The rivalry continued until February 2003, when Russo parted ways with SEX. In the following months, Jarrett feuded with the remaining members of SEX, then began feuding with Raven and Raven's Nest, the group of wrestlers that Raven controlled. On June 11, 2003, Jarrett faced Raven and A.J. Styles in a 3-way match for the NWA World Heavyweight Championship. Styles pinned Jarrett to win the title after the returning Russo struck Jarrett with a guitar. Jarrett regained the title from Styles on October 22, 2003, turning heel. Jarrett was unable to escape Styles, losing the title to him on April 21, 2004 in a steel cage after Russo—who had returned as the new TNA Director of Authority—chose Styles to replace the injured Chris Harris. Jarrett would get revenge on May 19, however, by hitting Styles with a guitar during a title match, which enabled Ron Killings to win the title. Jarrett then defeated Killings, Styles, Raven and Harris in a King of the Mountain match on June 2 to win his third NWA World Heavyweight Championship.

In early 2005, Jarrett formed a dominant stable known as Planet Jarrett with Monty Brown, Kip James, and, later, Rhino. Jarrett also used the phrase "Planet Jarrett" to refer to TNA as a whole, reflecting his real-life stake in the company and his prominent role within the promotion. On April 3, 2005, Jarrett defended the championship outside NWA territory, wrestling Ray González in the International Wrestling Association. González won with a clean pin and briefly held the belt, being stripped on the same card. The championship was returned to Jarrett and the change was not recorded as official by TNA or the NWA. Despite his efforts to hold on to the title, however, he lost it to long-time rival A.J. Styles at Hard Justice on May 15, 2005.

Jarrett won his fourth NWA World Heavyweight Championship on September 15, 2005, defeating Raven at a Border City Wrestling (BCW) event. He lost the title to Rhino at Bound for Glory on October 23, but regained it on the November 3 episode of Impact!. Jarrett's reign lasted until Against All Odds on February 12, 2006, when he was defeated by Christian Cage.

In the following months, Jarrett feuded with Sting, who had declared that Jarrett was a "cancer" in TNA. In the course of the feud, Scott Steiner debuted in TNA as an ally of Jarrett.

At Slammiversary on June 18, 2006, Jarrett won his sixth NWA World Heavyweight Championship in a King of the Mountain match when referee Earl Hebner tipped over a ladder that Christian Cage and Sting were simultaneously climbing. He retained the title in a bout with Sting at Hard Justice after Cage turned on Sting, hitting him with one of Jarrett's guitars. After a polygraph proved that Jarrett had cheated to win the NWA World Heavyweight Championship, Director of Authority Jim Cornette forced Jarrett to wrestle Samoa Joe in a "fan's revenge" lumberjack match at No Surrender, with Joe winning the match. At the Bound for Glory pay-per-view on October 22, Sting defeated Jarrett for the NWA World Heavyweight Championship after Jarrett was forced to submit to Sting's signature finisher, the Scorpion Death Lock.

Various feuds (2006–2010) 

On the following episode of Impact!, Jarrett announced in an interview that he was leaving TNA indefinitely. For the following six months, Jarrett did not appear on TNA television, instead focusing on his role as Vice President of TNA Entertainment. Jarrett, however, temporarily returned to TNA television on the April 12, 2007 episode of Impact!, and aligned himself with Samoa Joe, by helping him defeat A.J. Styles, turning face. On April 15, 2007, at Lockdown, Jarrett, making his in-ring return, and the rest of Team Angle defeated Team Cage in a Lethal Lockdown match. The following episode of Impact!, he delivered his first promo in months, stating it's not all about Jeff Jarrett and he returned to give back to the wrestlers and fans, officially completing his face turn. He then entered into a feud with Robert Roode, losing a match to him at Sacrifice. Jarrett was then scheduled to take on Styles with the winner to earn a spot in the King of the Mountain match but could not compete due to "personal issues". In 2008, Jarrett was featured in the promotion of TNA's "Maximum Impact!" tour of the United Kingdom.

At Hard Justice, Samoa Joe defeated Booker T using the Acoustic Equalizer, the trademark move of Jarrett, setting up for his return to in-ring action, as quoted by the website, "Obviously, we all know who used a guitar in the past!" referring indirectly to Jarrett. After numerous weeks of Jarrett's theme song playing and his guitar appearing on TNA programming, Jarrett returned to Impact! on September 11, 2008. At No Surrender, he would help Joe defeat Kurt Angle and Cage and assist Joe in retaining the TNA World Heavyweight Championship by hitting Angle with a guitar, keeping him a face. The following Thursday on Impact!, Jarrett cut his first promo since Slammiversary, claiming that the current respect angle that Sting was involved in was actually a matter of the veterans refusing to pass the torch to the young guys. Angle came out and challenged Jarrett to a match at Bound for Glory IV, but Jarrett refused, saying he had nothing left to prove, and instead pointed to the screen to reveal the debuting Mick Foley. On the next episode of Impact!, Jarrett relented to verbal cheap shots taken by Angle regarding Jarrett's children and accepted the match at Bound for Glory. The feud got more personal due to Angle mentioning Jarrett's wife, which led to Foley being named the special enforcer for their match. At Bound For Glory Jarrett returned to the ring after a 17-month absence, and defeated Angle using his Acoustic Equalizer.

On the November 20, 2008 episode of Impact!, Kurt Angle threatened Mick Foley and wanted another match against Jarrett at Final Resolution after Foley announced that it was Angle versus Rhino at Final Resolution. Angle continued to demand a match with Jarrett and he said if he could not get him at Final Resolution, he would wrestle Foley. Angle then slapped Foley causing Jarrett to come out and talk about what Angle wanted and then what Jarrett wanted (Angle to be fired). Because of Angle's contract clause, Jarrett could not fire him, so he made this stipulation: if Angle lost to Rhino, he would be fired from TNA; if Angle beat Rhino, he would get Jarrett at Genesis. Angle defeated Rhino at Final Resolution, allowing him to face Jarrett at Genesis. The feud got even more personal when it started involving Jarrett's three daughters during the December 11, 2008 episode of Impact!. Angle said that they would become orphans after Genesis and that "Uncle Kurt" may find it in his heart to adopt them and make them his. Jarrett came out to confront him but was held back by his longtime friend, BG James, TNA Personnel Terry Taylor, referee Earl Hebner, and Scott D'Amore. On January 11 at Genesis, Jarrett lost to Angle. Jarrett suffered some injuries, but able to compete on the TNA Maximum Impact Tour, by facing against Angle in two singles and a few tag team matches with A.J. Styles against Angle and Scott Steiner. Then on February 12, 2009, Jarrett returned to Impact! to stop Angle from forcing Sting to lay down and gain an easy championship victory. The next week, Jarrett allowed Angle to have another match against Sting, and on February 26, 2009 Jarrett announced Angle versus Sting at Destination X for the TNA World Heavyweight Championship.

Jarrett would then enter a feud with Mick Foley, who attacked him while shooting his DVD at the TNA Asylum. The two would meet in a four-way match at Sacrifice involving Kurt Angle and Sting with Jarrett putting his voting shares in TNA on the line, Angle putting his leadership of The Main Event Mafia, Sting putting his career, and Foley putting the TNA World Heavyweight Championship; Sting would go on to pin Angle for the victory and leadership of the Main Event Mafia. Jarrett later pinned Eric Young in order to qualify for the King of the Mountain match, however, Young attacked Jarrett after the match in the storyline. The following week, Jarrett called out Young and offered to turn the other cheek, but instead Young provoked him by saying that he pays more attention to wrestling than his own daughters just like his father Jerry which resulted in Jarrett slapping Young and assaulting him. Jarrett also would accidentally punch referee Earl Hebner while Hebner was trying to separate the two. On the June 11 episode of Impact!, Mick Foley kayfabe fined and suspended Jarrett and threw him out of the arena as a punishment. The following week, Foley threw a party for Jarrett and welcomed his return to TNA in order to have him on his side at Slammiversary. At Slammiversary, Jarrett refused to give Foley the belt in the King of the Mountain match, which was won by Kurt Angle after assistance from Samoa Joe. Shortly after Slammiversary, Jarrett once again disappeared from TNA programming. During his hiatus, it was reported that Jarrett had lost all of his backstage power in TNA and would return only as a wrestler.

On the December 3 episode of Impact!, Jarrett made his first appearance in months via telephone, refusing to help Mick Foley regain control over TNA after Dixie Carter had announced that Hulk Hogan was coming to TNA. On the December 10 episode of Impact!, Foley met with Jarrett, who agreed to return and help him deal with Carter and Hogan. On January 4, 2010, Hogan made his debut, confronted Jarrett and claimed that he had to earn his spot in the company. The following week, Jarrett started showing signs of a heel turn as he threatened Hogan with legal actions; however, on the January 28 episode of Impact!, he changed his mind and agreed to fight for his spot. In the main event of the show, he came out to no entrance music or pyrotechnics and was defeated by Mr. Anderson after a low blow. This started an angle of Hogan's business partner Eric Bischoff, acting on his own without Hogan, having Jarrett work humiliating jobs backstage at the Impact! Zone, such as flipping burgers and cleaning restrooms, while also booking him in unfavorable matches, such as surprise Falls Count Anywhere and handicap matches.

On the March 22 episode of Impact!, after Jarrett broke a guitar over Bischoff's head, Bischoff placed him and Mick Foley, another wrestler he had had problems with, against each other in a No Disqualification match, where the loser would get fired from the company. Jarrett won the match, refereed by Beer Money, Inc., and with Foley fired from the company, Hogan ordered Bischoff to lay off of Jarrett. The following week, Hogan, prior to leaving on a business trip, apologized to Jarrett for Bischoff's behavior and gave him a chance to earn the number one contendership to the TNA World Heavyweight Championship in a match against the world champion A.J. Styles. With Hogan out of the building, Bischoff and Styles' manager Ric Flair interfered in the match and cost Jarrett the number one contendership. Later in the evening, Jarrett was announced as the second member of Abyss' Team Hogan in the annual Lethal Lockdown match, where they would meet Team Flair, led by Sting. At Lockdown, Team Hogan (Abyss, Jarrett, Rob Van Dam and Jeff Hardy) defeated Team Flair (Sting, Desmond Wolfe, Robert Roode and James Storm), when Bischoff turned face and helped Team Hogan pick up the victory, effectively ending his feud with Jarrett. Just before Lockdown, Jarrett said that he was going to find out the answers to Sting's behavior, which led into a brawl on Impact!, with Sting leaving a beaten Jarrett in the ring, which in turn led to their match at Sacrifice. At Sacrifice, Sting assaulted Jarrett prior to their match and then dragged him in to the ring, where he scored a pinfall in seconds over his bloodied opponent.

Jarrett was sidelined for a month before making his return at Slammiversary VIII, where he cost Sting his TNA World Heavyweight Championship match against Rob Van Dam. On the June 24 episode of Impact!, Sting assaulted Jarrett to the point that TNA president Dixie Carter suspended him for 30 days without pay the following week. During Sting's suspension, Jarrett found a new enemy in Kevin Nash, who claimed that Jarrett himself, and not Sting, was what was wrong with TNA. Sting returned from his suspension on the August 5 episode of Impact!, wearing a new red face paint, and, together with Nash, beat down Jarrett, Bischoff and Hogan. On the August 26 episode of Impact!, Jarrett attempted to recruit Samoa Joe to help him against Nash and Sting, but was turned down. Thus Jarrett was left alone for a match, where he was defeated by Nash, after an interference from Sting. The following week, Sting defeated Jarrett in a singles match, after an interference from Kevin Nash. After the match, Samoa Joe joined Jarrett and drove Sting and Nash away. At No Surrender, Jarrett and Joe defeated Sting and Nash in a tag team match, after Jarrett hit Sting with his own baseball bat.

Immortal and feud with Kurt Angle (2010–2011) 

At Bound for Glory, Jarrett and Joe faced Sting, Nash and their newest ally D'Angelo Dinero in a two-on-three handicap match after Hulk Hogan, who was scheduled to team with Joe and Jarrett, was forced to pull out due to a back surgery; at the end of the match, Jarrett abandoned Joe and left Joe behind to be pinned by Nash, thus Jarrett turned heel for the first time since 2007. At the end of the event, Jarrett aligned himself with Hulk Hogan, who ended up making a surprise appearance, Eric Bischoff, Abyss and the new TNA World Heavyweight Champion Jeff Hardy, all of whom made heel turns with the exception of the already heel Abyss, in the process revealing themselves as the "they" Abyss had referred to. On the following episode of Impact!, Jarrett explained that he had joined the stable, now known as Immortal, in order to get back at Dixie Carter for taking away his backstage power in TNA, while also wanting to end the career of Kurt Angle, who had proclaimed that he would retire from professional wrestling if he failed to win the TNA World Heavyweight Championship at Bound for Glory. Jarrett then attacked Angle, when he was being restrained by TNA's security officers. The following week, Samoa Joe attempted to avenge what had happened at Bound for Glory, but was restrained by the security officers, before being beat down by Jarrett.

At Turning Point, Jarrett defeated Joe after choking him out with a baton, following interference from Gunner and Murphy, his security officers. On the following episode of Impact!, Jarrett assaulted Joe after he had defeated Gunner and Murphy in a handicap match, but was then chased away by the returning Kurt Angle. At Final Resolution, Jarrett faced Joe in a submission match; after a pre-match assault and later an interference by Gunner and Murphy, Jarrett forced Joe to submit with an ankle lock. On the January 6, 2011 episode of Impact!, Angle interrupted Jarrett's $100,000 mixed martial arts (MMA) challenge and signed a contract to face him at Genesis in an MMA exhibition match, since he had promised not to wrestle again. The match was thrown out in the third round after Jarrett blinded Angle; after the match, Jarrett bloodied Angle, before announcing that he was ending his mixed martial arts career and promised that his current (and Angle's former) wife, Karen Jarrett, would be joining the retirement party.

On the January 13 episode of Impact!, Karen made her return and stopped Angle just as he was about to attack Jarrett, telling him that she would not allow him to ruin their personal lives and promised to tell all about their divorce the following week. The following week, Karen slapped Angle, providing a distraction which allowed Jarrett to beat him down. On February 13 at Against All Odds, Jarrett defeated Angle in a singles match and as a result Angle was forced to walk Karen down the aisle, when she and Jarrett renewed their wedding vows on the March 3 edition of Impact!. On March 3, Angle proceeded to destroy the wedding set with an axe and forced wedding guest, New York Jet Bart Scott to tap out with the ankle lock.

On April 17 at Lockdown, Jarrett defeated Angle in an "Ultra Male Rules" two-out-of-three Falls steel cage match, with help from Karen. It was later reported that Jarrett had severely bruised his ribs in the match. On the May 12 episode of Impact Wrestling, Angle revealed a name from Jarrett's past, Chyna, as his backup in taking care of him and Karen. At Sacrifice, Angle and Chyna defeated the Jarretts in a mixed tag team match. With Karen out of the picture, Angle defeated Jarrett on June 12 at Slammiversary IX in what was billed as the "final battle" between the two. However, on the following episode of Impact Wrestling, Jarrett challenged Angle to a Parking Lot Brawl and agreed to sign a contract that would force him to move to Mexico without Angle's children; Angle ended up winning the fight after choking Jarrett with a shirt, forcing him to say "adiós", thus ending the long feud in the process. The following week on Impact Wrestling, Bischoff forced Jarrett to obey the match stipulations and exiled him to Mexico.

Backstage roles and departure (2011–2014) 
Jarrett returned to TNA on the July 14 episode of Impact Wrestling, showing off the "Mexican Heavyweight Championship" belt, playing off the AAA Mega Championship he had won during his stay in Mexico. On the August 18 episode of Impact Wrestling, Jarrett aligned himself with the Mexican America stable by helping its members Anarquia and Hernandez defeat Beer Money, Inc. for the TNA World Tag Team Championship.

In October, Jarrett began feuding with the returning Jeff Hardy. On November 13 at Turning Point, Jarrett lost to Hardy three times in a row, first in six seconds, then in six minutes and finally in ten seconds. On December 11 at Final Resolution, Jarrett was defeated by Hardy in a steel cage match. As per stipulation of the match, Jarrett was, in storyline, fired from TNA on the following episode of Impact Wrestling. In reality, he was written off television to oversee Ring Ka King, a new promotion based in India that is a subsidiary of TNA.

After Ring Ka King, Jarrett wrestled for AAA without work in TNA. In 2013, Jarrett assumed the backstage role of Executive Vice President of Development/Original Programming. In 2013, Jarrett and Country star Toby Keith tried to buy TNA; however, when both met Bob Carter, he demanded that his daughter Dixie remain in the company as on-screen President. Jarrett and Keith decided to create their own company. On December 22, 2013, Jarrett resigned from TNA Entertainment. Jarrett remained an investor in TNA Wrestling after his resignation came in effect on January 6, 2014.

Lucha Libre AAA Worldwide (2004–2006) 

Jarrett made his debut for Mexican promotion Lucha Libre AAA Worldwide on March 21, 2004, defeating Latin Lover to win the 2004 Rey de Reyes tournament. Over the next two years, Jarrett would make several sporadic appearances for AAA as a member of the heel stable La Legión Extranjera, before the working relationship between AAA and TNA was ended.

International Wrestling Association (2004–2005) 
In 2004, the International Wrestling Association (IWA) ran an angle that satirized its main competition, the World Wrestling Council (WWC), by having a heel stable led by Ray González adopt its former name of "Capitol Sports" during an invasion angle. On October 9, 2004, González announced that Capitol had formed an alliance with TNA for Golpe de Estado and that this move would bring in Jarrett, then the NWA World Heavyweight Champion, Robert Roode, Konnan and Shawn Hernandez to compete on its behalf. At Golpe de Estado, Jarrett defeated Shane Sewell to retain the NWA title and help the heels gain an advantage in the series. However, González lost with Capitol and IWA tied, ending the angle. Following a face turn, González's association with Jarrett soon concluded, leading to a feud between them. This angle concluded on April 3, 2005, when González defeated Jarrett in a titular contest to win the NWA World Heavyweight Championship. However, his reign was short, being stripped on the same event and at the time the title change was unrecognized by the NWA, with Jarrett returning to TNA with the belt. Starting in 2015, the NWA recognizes Gonzalez's championship reign.

Lucha Libre AAA Worldwide (2011–2015) 
In February 2010, TNA restarted their working relationship with AAA and in early May 2011, Jarrett made his return to AAA television, announcing his and TNA's alignment with Dorian Roldán and his heel stable La Sociedad and their participation in Triplemanía XIX. Konnan, the co-leader of La Sociedad and former TNA worker, however, was against the idea of his former employer coming to AAA and believed that Roldán had made a mistake by inviting him to the promotion. Jarrett and Abyss arrived to AAA on May 18 for a confrontation with Konnan and La Sociedad. In the end, Jarrett and Konnan revealed that they were in fact on the same page with each other and turned on AAA Mega Champion El Zorro with Konnan announcing that Jarrett would be challenging for his title at Triplemanía XIX. On June 18 at Triplemanía XIX, Jarrett defeated El Zorro to become the new AAA Mega Champion. On July 31 at Verano de Escándalo, Jarrett successfully defended the title in a three-way elimination match against Dr. Wagner, Jr. and L.A. Park, when someone wearing El Zorro's old mask interfered and hit Park with a guitar. This person was later revealed as La Sociedad member Chessman, whom Konnan had sent to interfere in the match in order to have Park go after El Zorro instead of continuing to chase his stablemate's title. The storyline continued on October 9 at Héroes Inmortales, where both Jarrett and Park took part in the Copa Antonio Peña gauntlet match. After working together for the entire match, Park eventually turned on Jarrett and eliminated him. After a distraction from the Jarretts, Park was attacked by another masked El Zorro, costing him the match.

Jarrett returned to AAA on March 18, 2012, at Rey de Reyes, where he cost L.A. Park his opportunity to earn a shot at the AAA Mega Championship in the finals of the Rey de Reyes tournament. Later that same event, Jarrett lost the AAA Mega Championship to El Mesías, following interference from Park, ending his reign at 274 days, which was at the time the longest reign in the title's history. On August 5 at Triplemanía XX, Jarrett teamed up with the debuting Kurt Angle as Team Dorian Roldán in a Hair vs. Hair match, where they faced Team Joaquín Roldán (L.A. Park and Electroshock), with the Roldáns' hairs on the line. Electroshock won the match for his team by pinning Angle, forcing Dorian to have his head shaved bald. However, after the match, the La Sociedad members overpowered the winners and shaved Joaquín bald. Jarrett made a surprise return on December 2 at Guerra de Titanes, hitting L.A. Park with a guitar, after he had escaped a six-way steel cage Lucha de Apuestas.

Jarrett's next AAA appearance took place on June 16, 2013, at Triplemanía XXI, where he, Matt Morgan and Monster Pain defeated AAA World Trios Champions Los Psycho Circus (Monster Clown, Murder Clown and Psycho Clown) in a non-title match. On December 8 at Guerra de Titanes, Jarrett was pinned by El Mesías in an eight-man tag team main event, where he, Daga, La Parka Negra and Psicosis were defeated by El Mesías, Cibernético, El Hijo del Perro Aguayo and La Parka. Post-match, Jarrett took part in the reformation of La Sociedad.

On March 16, 2014, at Rey de Reyes, Jarrett represented La Sociedad in a six-man tag team match, where he, Máscara Año 2000 Jr. and El Texano Jr. faced Cibernético, Electroshock and Psycho Clown. At the end of the match, AAA president Joaquín Roldán hit Jarrett with his own guitar, after which he was pinned by Cibernético. Jarrett was defeated in similar fashion by Electroshock in another six-man tag team match on June 27, after which he was challenged to a Hair vs. Hair match.
On May 24, 2015, Jarrett appeared at AAA's Lucha Libre World Cup event on behalf of his Global Force Wrestling promotion, providing English commentary for the semi-final matches of the event and scouting talent for the upcoming GFW events.

Wrestle-1 (2013) 
On October 6, 2013, Jarrett went to Japan to work an event for Wrestle-1 in Tokyo's Korakuen Hall, teaming with the promotion's founder Keiji Mutoh and Masakatsu Funaki in a six-man tag team match, where they defeated Desperado (Masayuki Kono, Kazma Sakamoto and Ryoji Sai).

Global Force Wrestling (2014–2017) 
When Jarrett left TNA, he announced intentions to create a new promotion. Jarrett revealed the promotion's name, Global Force Wrestling (GFW), on April 7, 2014. Since the founding of GFW, Jarrett has represented the organization at TNA, NJPW, and other companies' events. Jarrett made his in-ring debut for the promotion on October 28, 2015, defeating Nathan Cruz as part of the GFW UK Invasion tour. During GFW's return to the UK, Jarrett defeated the likes of Noam Dar, Doug Williams and Pepper Parks from March 2 to 5.

New Japan Pro-Wrestling (2014–2015) 

On June 21, 2014, it was announced GFW had inked a working agreement with New Japan Pro-Wrestling (NJPW) On August 10, Jarrett made an appearance for NJPW to officially sign the agreement. Later in the event, he joined the villainous Bullet Club stable. Jarrett returned to NJPW on October 13 at King of Pro-Wrestling, where he accompanied Bullet Club stablemate A.J. Styles for his IWGP Heavyweight Championship defense. After Jarrett's outside interference was stopped by the returning Yoshitatsu, Styles lost the title to Hiroshi Tanahashi. Jarrett made his next NJPW appearance on November 8 at Power Struggle, where he helped Styles defeat Yoshitatsu, whom he afterwards also hit with a guitar. Jarrett made his NJPW in-ring debut on January 4, 2015, at Wrestle Kingdom 9 in Tokyo Dome, where he and his Bullet Club stablemates Bad Luck Fale and Yujiro Takahashi were defeated by Hiroyoshi Tenzan, Satoshi Kojima and Tomoaki Honma, after he accidentally hit Takahashi with a guitar.

Total Nonstop Action Wrestling / Impact Wrestling (2015, 2017) 
Jarrett returned to TNA on the June 24, 2015 episode of Impact Wrestling, alongside his wife Karen Jarrett; Jarrett announced that he was part of the King of the Mountain match at Slammiversary XIII, while also promoting his new promotion Global Force Wrestling (GFW). Jarrett would win his record third King of the Mountain match, thus capturing the newly reactivated and renamed TNA King of the Mountain Championship on June 28 stating that he would be taking the belt to GFW. On August 12, Jarrett was appointed Impact Wrestlings new authority figure by TNA President Dixie Carter after General Manager Bully Ray was attacked, which led to Jarrett vacating the King of the Mountain Championship. The week after, it was revealed that Karen Jarrett orchestrated the attacks on Bully Ray and Drew Galloway, claiming that TNA was her husband's company and that he deserved it. Jarrett turned his back on Carter, choosing to align with his wife and turning heel in the process. On the September 16 episode of Impact Wrestling, Carter made a challenge to Jarrett, putting her TNA shares up against his for full control of the company, by setting up a 10-man tag team match. It was later reported that Jarrett had sold his minority stake to Panda Energy. On the September 16 edition of Impact Wrestling, Team TNA (Galloway, Lashley, Eddie Edwards, Bram and Davey Richards) defeated Team GFW (Sonjay Dutt, Jeff Jarrett, Eric Young, Chris Mordetzky and Brian Myers) in a Lethal Lockdown Match, resulting in Dixie gaining possession of Jarrett's TNA stake and, as a result, full control of TNA.

On January 5, 2017, it was announced that Jarrett had rejoined Impact Wrestling, now under the ownership of Anthem Sports & Entertainment In April 2017, Jarrett stated that Impact Wrestling and Global Force Wrestling were "becoming one day by day." On June 28, it was reported that Impact Wrestling had acquired Global Force Wrestling. On September 5, it was announced that Jarrett would be taking an "indefinite leave of absence" from GFW. On October 23, Impact Wrestling confirmed the termination of its relationship with Jarrett and his company Global Force Entertainment Inc.

Shortly after the Anthem termination of its relationship with Jarrett and his company Global Force Entertainment Inc, Anthem would still continue to use GFW's tape library with them using the shows One Night Only: GFW Amped Anthology and the promotion reverted to the Impact Wrestling name as Jarrett owned the rights to GFW. During the time of the rebranding, the company had been named Impact Wrestling after its flagship program, and had assumed the name of Global Force Wrestling (GFW). The Global Wrestling Network (GWN) name had been influenced by its connection to GFW. In October Impact Wrestling launched the streaming service named Global Wrestling Network despite Jarrett owning the GFW rights. On August 14, 2018, Jarrett and his company Global Force Entertainment announced that it had filed a lawsuit against Impact Wrestling's parent company Anthem Sports & Entertainment in the District Court of Tennessee for copyright infringement over the GFW rights, as Jarrett owned all Global Force Wrestling properties since its creation in 2014. If the lawsuit by Jarrett is successful, Impact would need to immediately suspend the operations of their streaming subscription service under its current name and the company would have to censor the GFW name in their content. A mistrial was declared in July 2020 and the lawsuit was not successful as the belief from the neutral judge was that Jarrett infiltrated the jury. The two sides ultimately agreed to a settlement in January 2021.

 Lucha Libre AAA Worldwide (2018–2019, 2022) 

On June 3, 2018, Jarrett made a surprise second return to AAA at Verano de Escandalo where he unmasked himself as the new leader of the MAD heel stable and inserted himself into the events Rey Wagner vs. Rey Mysterio Jr. main event for the AAA Mega Championship, making it a three-way match. Jarrett would win the match and become the AAA Mega Champion for the second time after Konnan returned to AAA during the match as an imposter masked La Parka with referee attire on, revealing upon unmasking after the match that he was associated with MAD and aided Jarrett in winning the title by counting the pinfall. On July 13 in Querétaro, Jarrett teamed with El Hijo del Fantasma defeating Psycho Clown and Pagano. On August 25, at Triplemanía XXVI, Jarrett lost the Mega title to Fénix in a four-way match, which also involved Brian Cage and Rich Swann. at Héroes Inmortales XII, Jarrett lost to Rey Wagner in a Lucha de Apuestas hair vs. hair match. at Rey de Reyes, Jarrett, Killer Kross and La Máscara lost to Las Fresas Salvajes (Mamba and Máximo) and Psycho Clown in a Six-man tag team Steel cage match.

On March 31, 2022, Jarret returned to Lucha Libre AAA Worldwide at their AAA Invades WrestleCon event, where he was revealed as the leader of La Empresa. At Triplemanía XXX on April 30, Jarret and Rey Escorpion brawled with Latin Lover and Vampiro.

 WWE (2018, 2019–2021, 2022) 
On February 19, 2018, WWE announced that Jarrett would be inducted into the WWE Hall of Fame, an announcement that was met with "widespread surprise" due to the circumstances of Jarrett's departure from the promotion since October 1999 and his role in founding Impact Wrestling. Jarrett was inducted on April 6, by his long-time friend Road Dogg, with the two men singing a duet of Jarrett's country song "With My Baby Tonight".

In January 2019, Jarrett was hired by WWE as a backstage producer. He appeared as a surprise second entrant in the Royal Rumble match. Jarrett proposed a duet with Elias, who seemingly accepted before smashing Jarrett with his guitar as the match started, leading to Jarrett's elimination by Elias. After the event, Jarrett was rehired by WWE as a backstage producer. The following night on Raw after Royal Rumble, Jarrett, joined by his former partner, Road Dogg, interrupted Elias and the two sang "With My Baby Tonight". Elias attacked both Jarrett and Road Dogg with a guitar. On the February 4 episode of Raw, Jarrett wrestled in his first WWE match on Raw in over 19 years, losing to Elias. After the match, Jarrett smashed Elias with his guitar as payback for the previous week. In March 2019, it was reported that Jarrett was promoted to a full-time member of the creative team. On July 30, 2021, it was reported that Jarrett had quietly departed from WWE in January.

Jarrett made a one-off return to WWE on the January 21, 2022, episode of SmackDown, appearing in a backstage segment with Rick Boogs and Shinsuke Nakamura. In May 2022, it was reported that Jarrett had rejoined WWE, serving as the promotion's Senior Vice President of Live Events. At SummerSlam in July 2022, Jarrett served as a special guest referee for the Undisputed WWE Tag Team Championship match between the Usos and the Street Profits. He once again departed WWE in August 2022.

 Game Changer Wrestling; National Wrestling Alliance (2022) 
On January 1, 2022, Jarrett made a surprise appearance for Game Changer Wrestling at the promotion's Die 4 This event, hitting Effy with his trademark guitar shot, debuting a new persona in the process. He was dubbed "The Last Outlaw." Jarrett dressed in all black attire and debuted a new theme song. On January 15, he appeared at GCW Say You Will, attacking Effy's tag team partner Allie Katch with another guitar shot. Jarrett's attacks set up a match with Effy at the promotion's The Wrld on GCW pay-per-view, which Jarrett won. It was Jarrett's first match since 2019.

Jarrett was named an ambassador on February 11, 2022, for the National Wrestling Alliance's Crockett Cup event, which took place on March 19 and 20, 2022. He was later announced as the special guest referee for the NWA Worlds Heavyweight Championship match between Matt Cardona and Nick Aldis.

 All Elite Wrestling (2022–present) 
On November 2, 2022, Jarrett made his debut for All Elite Wrestling (AEW) on Dynamite, making his first televised wrestling appearance on TBS in over 21 years since the final episode of WCW Thunder on March 21, 2001. Jarrett aligned himself with The Lethal Connection (Jay Lethal, Satnam Singh, Cole Karter, and  Sonjay Dutt) after attacking Darby Allin. Jarrett would go on to declare war on the entire AEW roster and fan base. It was subsequently announced by AEW president Tony Khan that Jarrett would serve as AEW's Director of Business Development. According to Jarrett and Khan, one of Jarrett's responsibilities as Director of Business Development was to help expand AEW's live event schedule and prepare the company to run house shows, and on February 1, 2023, AEW announced they would begin house shows titled AEW House Rules. AEW's first House Rules event took place on March 18 at the Hobart Arena in Troy, Ohio.

Other ventures
In a December 2021 news release from the Prospect League, Jarrett was among several members of an ownership group to purchase the Springfield Lucky Horseshoes, a collegiate summer league baseball team based in Springfield, Illinois, temporarily naming it Capital City Baseball until a name was determined.

In February 2022, the ownership group announced the name of the Springfield Lucky Horseshoes after receiving input. Since the announcement, Jarrett has been active in the Springfield area promoting the team, which marked its 14th season in 2022 and the first season since its rebrand.

 Other media 
In 1993, Jarrett had a small cameo role in the Michael J. Fox movie Life With Mikey, appearing alongside Jerry Lawler as a wrestler named "Evil Eye".

In 2005, Jarrett made a guest appearance on the comedy show Blue Collar TV.

TNA announced that on April 14, 2009 the first-ever Jarrett DVD release would be a four-disc set, including his best TNA matches and moments, a lengthy and candid interview on his life, career, and TNA Wrestling, rare photos, and guest commentary, among others.

He is a playable character in WCW vs. the World, WWF Attitude, WWF WrestleMania 2000, WCW Backstage Assault, TNA Impact!, and TNA Wrestling Impact!.

In 2018, Jarrett appeared in the music video "Dr. Dare Rides Again" for the pop punk band Send Request.

In May 2021, Jarrett along with co-host Conrad Thompson began the podcast My World with Jeff Jarrett discussing a wide variety of subjects from Jarrett's professional wrestling career.

 Filmography 

 Personal life 

Jarrett married his "high school sweetheart" Jill Gregory on November 14, 1992, with whom he had three daughters. Jill died of breast cancer on May 23, 2007. In 2009, it was reported that Jarrett was romantically linked to Karen Angle. This resulted in TNA president Dixie Carter placing Jarrett on a leave of absence. In 2009, Jarrett returned to TNA, using the real-life situation briefly as a storyline. On April 6, 2010, Jarrett and Karen announced their engagement; they were married on August 21, 2010.

Jarrett and his father Jerry reconciled in 2015, after years since having a falling-out over the business in TNA.

On October 25, 2017, Jarrett entered an in-patient rehabilitation facility. The rehab was set up by Karen Jarrett and WWE. Days earlier Real Canadian Wrestling promoter Steven Ewaschuk had claimed that Jarrett had showed up to their event late and intoxicated and then continued drinking until passing out in their locker room prior to his match. Jarrett went on to wrestle the first of his two scheduled matches, but boarded a plane home before the second event.

 Championships and accomplishments 

 American Wrestling Association Rookie of the Year (1986)European Wrestling PromotionEWP World Heavyweight Championship (1 time)
 Lucha Libre AAA World Wide AAA Mega Championship (2 times)
 AAA Rey de Reyes (2004)1
 Continental Wrestling Association CWA Heavyweight Championship (1 time)
 AWA Southern Tag Team Championship (4 times) – with Billy Travis (3) and Pat Tanaka (1)
 CWA/AWA International Tag Team Championship (2 times) – with Pat Tanaka (1) and Paul Diamond (1)
 NWA Mid-America Heavyweight Championship (5 times)
 NWA Cyberspace NWA Cyberspace Heavyweight Championship (1 time)
 NWA Total Nonstop Action / Total Nonstop Action WrestlingNWA World Heavyweight Championship (6 times)
 TNA King of the Mountain Championship (1 time)
 Gauntlet for the Gold (2004 – Heavyweight)
 King of the Mountain (2004, 2006, 2015)
 TNA Hall of Fame (2015)
TNA Year End Awards (1 time)
Memorable Moment of the Year (2003) Jeff Jarrett attacks Hulk Hogan in Japan
 Pennsylvania Championship Wrestling PCW United States Championship (1 time)
 Pro Wrestling Illustrated Feud of the Year (1992) with Jerry Lawler vs. The Moondogs
 Most Inspirational Wrestler of the Year (2007)
 Ranked No. 5 of the top 500 singles wrestlers in the PWI 500 in 2000
 Ranked No. 141 of the top 500 singles wrestlers of the PWI Years in 2003
 Ranked No. 78 of the Top 100 tag teams of the PWI Years with Jerry Lawler in 2003River City WrestlingRCW Championship (1 time)
 United States Wrestling Association USWA Heavyweight Championship (1 time)
 USWA Southern Heavyweight Championship (9 times)
 USWA Unified World Heavyweight Championship (3 times)
 USWA World Tag Team Championship (14 times) – with Matt Borne (2), Jeff Gaylord (2), Cody Michaels (1), Jerry Lawler (4), Robert Fuller (3), and Brian Christopher (2)USA Championship WrestlingUSA North American Heavyweight Championship (1 time)
 Vendetta Pro Wrestling NWA Western States Heavyweight Championship (1 time)
 World Championship Wrestling WCW World Heavyweight Championship (4 times)
 WCW United States Heavyweight Championship (3 times)
 World Class Wrestling Association WCWA World Light Heavyweight Championship (2 times)
 WCWA World Tag Team Championship (3 times) – with Kerry Von Erich (1), Mil Máscaras (1), and Matt Borne (1)
 World Wrestling Federation / WWENWA North American Championship (1 time)2
 WWF European Championship (1 time)
 WWF Intercontinental Championship (6 times)
 WWF Tag Team Championship (1 time) – with Owen Hart
WWE Hall of Fame (Class of 2018)
 World Series Wrestling WSW Heavyweight Championship (1 time)
 World Wrestling All-Stars WWA World Heavyweight Championship (2 times)3
 Seven Deadly Sins Tournament (2001)WrestleCadeWrestleCade Heavyweight Championship (1 time)
 Wrestling Observer Newsletter'' Feud of the Year (1992) with Jerry Lawler vs. The Moondogs
 Most Overrated Wrestler (2005)Other championships'''
Memphis Grizzlies Wrestling Championship (1 time)
1 After AAA retracted their working relationship with Total Nonstop Action Wrestling, Jarrett's win was stricken from AAA's records. However, when the relationship was resumed in 2010, AAA once again began recognizing Jarrett as a former Rey de Reyes.

2 Wins the title while working for the World Wrestling Federation as part of an angle with the National Wrestling Alliance.

3 Upon winning the title for the second time, Jarrett instantly unified it with the NWA World Heavyweight Championship.

Luchas de Apuestas record

References

External links 

 
 
 
 
 

1967 births
20th-century professional wrestlers
21st-century professional wrestlers
AAA Mega Champions
American male professional wrestlers
American male television writers
American television writers
American podcasters
Bullet Club members
Impact Wrestling executives
Living people
New World Order (professional wrestling) members
NWA North American Heavyweight Champions
NWA/WCW/WWE United States Heavyweight Champions
NWA World Heavyweight Champions
TNA Legends/Global/Television/King of the Mountain Champions
Global Force Wrestling
Impact Hall of Fame inductees
People from Hendersonville, Tennessee
Professional wrestlers from Tennessee
Professional wrestling authority figures
Professional wrestling podcasters
Professional wrestling referees
Professional wrestling writers
Screenwriters from Tennessee
The Four Horsemen (professional wrestling) members
USWA Unified World Heavyweight Champions
USWA World Tag Team Champions
WCW World Heavyweight Champions
WWE executives
WWE Hall of Fame inductees
WWF European Champions
WWF/WWE Intercontinental Champions